The Toledo and Ohio Central Railway (T&OC) was a railway company in the U.S. state of Ohio from 1885 to 1952. In 1928 it was leased by the New York Central System, which purchased the line in 1938.

Precursors 
Atlantic & Lake Erie Railroad
Atlantic & Northwestern Railroad
Ohio Central Railroad
Columbus & Sunday Creek Valley Railroad
Ohio Central Railway
Zanesville & Western Railroad

References

External links
 

Railway companies established in 1885
Railway companies disestablished in 1952
Defunct Ohio railroads
Predecessors of the New York Central Railroad